Marios Demetriou (born 25 December 1990) is a Cypriot professional football who plays as a right back for Cypriot First Division club PAEEK.

Club career

Omonia Nicosia
Demetriou joined Omonia's academies at age seven. He made his first first-team appearance on 24 November 2012 for the senior squad during the 2012–13 season in a home win 4–2 against AEP Paphos, replacing Georgios Efrem in the 89th minute.

On 8 July 2017, he signed a contract renewal until the summer of 2020.

Loan to Alki Larnaca
In 2013–2014, Demetriou was given on loan to Alki.

Loan to Ermis Aradippou
On 30 June 2018, Demetriou joined Ermis Aradippou on loan until the end of the season.

Nea Salamina
On 31 August 2019, Demetriou signed for one year contract until June 2020 with Cypriot First Division club Nea Salamina.

PAEEK
On 21 July 2020, Demetriou signed for Cypriot club PAEEK until June 2021. In August 2021, PAEEK announced the renewal of his contract until 2022.

International career
He made his debut for the Cyprus national team on 11 October 2021 in a World Cup qualifier against Malta.

Career statistics

Honours

Club
Omonia
Cypriot Super Cup: 2012

PAEEK
Cypriot Second Division: 2020–21

References

External links
 UEFA profile
 

1992 births
Living people
Cypriot footballers
Cyprus under-21 international footballers
Cyprus international footballers
Cypriot First Division players
AC Omonia players
Alki Larnaca FC players
PAEEK players
Association football defenders
Association football midfielders